Basketball was among the sports contested at the 2019 Southeast Asian Games in the Philippines. The basketball tournament in the games featured four events; traditional 5-on-5 basketball and 3x3 basketball, for both men and women.

In 5-on-5, the Philippines were the 12-time defending champions in men's and Malaysia were the two-time defending champions in women's. 3x3 basketball was contested for the first time for both genders.

Competition schedule
3x3 basketball was held from 1 to 2 December 2019 and the regular 5-on-5 basketball event was held from 4 to 10 December 2019.

Participating nations

Venues
The regular 5-on-5 basketball tournament was held at the SM Mall of Asia Arena in Pasay, while 3x3 basketball tournament was played at the Filoil Flying V Centre in San Juan.

Cuneta Astrodome was also previously considered as a potential venue for 5-on-5 basketball, while the SM Mall of Asia Activity Center was considered to host the 3x3 basketball competitions.

The Filoil Flying V Centre was initially announced to be the venue for the 5x5 basketball as well after organizers failed to secure the SM Mall of Asia Arena or a similarly larger venue due to prior event bookings.

Medalists

Medal table

References

External links